The , also known as the Kidō Butai ("Mobile Force"), was a name used for a combined carrier battle group comprising most of the aircraft carriers and carrier air groups of the Imperial Japanese Navy (IJN) during the first eight months of the Pacific War.

At the time of its best-known operation, the attack on Pearl Harbor, in December 1941, the 1st Air Fleet was the world's largest fleet of aircraft carriers.

In its second generation, 1st Air Fleet was a land-based fleet of "kichi kōkūtai" (base air unit(s)).

Origins

In 1912, the British Royal Navy had established its own flying branch, the Royal Naval Air Service (RNAS). The IJN was modeled on the Royal Navy and the IJN Admiralty sought establishment of their own Naval Air Service. The IJN had also observed technical developments in other countries and saw military potential of the airplane. In 1913, the IJN seaplane carrier Wakamiya was converted into a seaplane tender and aircraft were purchased. The 1st and 2nd Air Fleet were to be the primary attack force of the IJNAS.

The Japanese carriers' experiences off China had helped further develop the IJN's carrier doctrine. One lesson learned in China was the importance of concentration and mass in projecting naval air power ashore. Therefore, in April 1941 the IJN formed the 1st Air Fleet to combine all of its fleet carriers under a single command. The IJN centered its doctrine on air strikes that combined the air groups within carrier divisions, rather than each individual carrier. When more than one carrier division was operating together, the divisions' air groups were combined with each other.  This doctrine of combined, massed, carrier air attack groups was the most advanced of its kind of all the world's navies.  The IJN, however, remained concerned that concentrating all of its carriers together would render them vulnerable to being wiped out all at once by a massive enemy air or surface strike. Thus, the IJN developed a compromise solution in which the fleet carriers would operate closely together within their carrier divisions but the divisions themselves would operate in loose rectangular formations, with approximately  separating the carriers from each other.

Although the concentration of so many fleet carriers into a single unit was a new and revolutionary offensive strategic concept, the First Air Fleet suffered from several defensive deficiencies which gave it, in Mark Peattie's words, a glass jaw':  it could throw a punch but couldn't take one." Japanese carrier anti-aircraft guns and associated fire control systems had several design and configuration deficiencies which limited their effectiveness. The IJN's fleet combat air patrol (CAP) consisted of too few fighter aircraft and was hampered by an inadequate early warning system, including a lack of radar. Poor radio communications with the fighter aircraft inhibited effective command and control of the CAP. The carriers' escorting warships were deployed as visual scouts in a ring at long range, not as close anti-aircraft escorts, as they lacked training, doctrine, and sufficient anti-aircraft guns. These deficiencies would eventually doom Kaga and other First Air Fleet carriers.

Organization

As a Carrier-Based Fleet
The First Air Fleet (Dai-ichi Kōkū Kantai) was a major component of the Combined Fleet (Rengō Kantai). Later that spring, a number of destroyers were added. On 10 April 1941, Second Kōkū Sentai comprised ,  and the 23rd Kuchikutai (Destroyer Unit). Fourth Kōkū Sentai consisted solely of light carrier  and her aircraft unit, until two destroyers were added in August. (At its inception, First Air Fleet did not include Third Kōkū Sentai and it did not include it on 7 December 1941. Third Kōkū Sentai (3rd Carrier Division, see table below) was attached to First Fleet, as distinct from First Air Fleet. On 1 April 1942, Third Kōkū Sentai was disbanded.) See the table titled "Transition", below.

When formed on 10 April 1941, First Air Fleet was a naval battlegroup with the single most powerful concentration of carrier-based aircraft in the world at the time. Military historian Gordon Prange called it "a revolutionary and potentially formidable instrument of sea power."

Fifth Kōkū Sentai (5th Carrier Division) was created on 1 September 1941 and was added to First Air Fleet . When the new aircraft carrier  was added to Fifth Kōkū Sentai, First Air Fleet consisted of Akagi, Kaga, Sōryū, Hiryū, Ryūjō, Kasuga Maru (renamed  ca. 31 August 1942),  and Zuikaku , along with their aircraft units and a number of destroyers. On 25 September 1941, Kasuga Maru was transferred from Fifth Kōkū Sentai to Fourth Kōkū Sentai. (Kasuga Maru was used to ferry aircraft to distant Japanese bases and should not be considered a front-line aircraft carrier. The status of any aircraft unit that she may have had is unclear.) Light carrier  was added to Fourth Kōkū Sentai on 22 December 1941. She was destroyed on 7 May 1942 in the Battle of the Coral Sea. Akagi, Kaga, Sōryū, and Hiryū were lost in the Battle of Midway.

Each Kōkū Sentai of First Air Fleet tended to include a pair of aircraft carriers, and each included the respective hikōkitai/hikōtai (aircraft/aviation unit(s)) of each aircraft carrier. Each Kōkū Sentai of First Air Fleet was a tactical unit that could be deployed separately or combined with other Kōkū Sentai of First Air Fleet, depending on the mission. For example, for operations against New Britain and New Guinea in January 1942, First Kōkū Sentai and Fifth Kōkū Sentai participated.

The number (from approximately two dozen up to approximately 80 aircraft) and type of aircraft varied, based on the capacity of the aircraft carrier. The large fleet carriers had three types of aircraft; fighters, level/torpedo bombers, and dive bombers. The smaller carriers tended to have only two types of aircraft, fighters and torpedo bombers.

At the beginning of the Pacific War, First Air Fleet included six fleet carriers: Akagi, Kaga, Sōryū, Hiryū, Shōkaku, and Zuikaku, and two light carriers: Ryūjō and Kasuga Maru (later renamed Taiyō), as shown in the table below.

On 14 July 1942, First Air Fleet was converted into Third Fleet (第三艦隊) and Eighth Fleet (第八艦隊), and 2nd Carrier Division (first generation) and 5th Carrier Division were disbanded. On the same date, the Japanese Navy's front-line aircraft carriers and their aircraft units came under the command of the 3rd Fleet, which was created in its sixth generation on that date.

Kidō Butai
The Kidō Butai (機動部隊, "Mobile Unit/Force") was the Combined Fleet's tactical designation for its combined carrier battle groups.  The title was used as a term of convenience; it was not a formal name for the organization.  It consisted of Japan's six largest carriers, carrying the 1st Air Fleet. This mobile task force was created for the attack on Pearl Harbor under Vice-Admiral Chūichi Nagumo in 1941. For the attack, the Kidō Butai consisted of six aircraft carriers (commanded by Chūichi Nagumo, Tamon Yamaguchi and Chūichi Hara) with 414 airplanes, two battleships, three cruisers, nine destroyers, eight tankers, 23 submarines, and four midget submarines. However, these escort ships were borrowed from other fleets and squadrons. It was the single most powerful naval fleet until four of the six aircraft carriers of the unit were destroyed in the disastrous Battle of Midway.

Transition (extract)

Commanders

Commander-in-Chief

Chief of Staff

As a Land-Based Air Fleet
On 1 July 1943, the 1st Air Fleet was recreated as an exclusively land-based air fleet. It was intended to consist of nearly 1,600 aircraft when completed, but the war situation prevented it from reaching that figure, and the second generation of this fleet began with only two Kōkūtai: Dai 261 Kaigun Kōkūtai (a one-month-old Zerosen unit) and Dai 761 Kaigun Kōkūtai (a bomber unit that was created on the same day as this fleet was).  On 30 September 1943, a cabinet meeting planned the  strategy. The plan intended the Kuril Islands, Bonin Islands, Mariana Islands, Caroline Islands, Biak, Sunda Islands and Burma to be unsinkable aircraft carriers. The 1st Air Fleet became the main force of this plan. However, it was soundly beaten in the Battle of the Philippine Sea. The IJN then moved the air fleet to the Philippines to regroup. However, due partly to the aircrews' lack of combat experience, the air fleet suffered severe losses in the Formosa Air Battle. After the battle it had only 41 aircraft. The only tactic left for them was the kamikaze attack.

Transition (extract)

Commanders

Commanders-in-Chief

Chiefs of Staff

Operations

Pearl Harbor

The Kidō Butai (also known as the Carrier Striking Task Force) set sail from Hitokappu Bay, Japan under Vice Admiral Chūichi Nagumo on 26 November 1941, arriving in Hawaiian waters on Sunday, 7 December 1941 Hawaiian time. At around 8am, the first wave began its attack on the US Pacific Fleet based at Pearl Harbor and on outlying airfields. By the end of the day, 21 American ships were either sunk or crippled, 188 aircraft were destroyed, and almost 2,500 Americans were killed. Japan was now formally at war with the United States.

For the attack on Pearl Harbor, this fleet had a strength of 103 level bombers, 128 dive bombers, 40 torpedo bombers, 88 fighter planes, plus 91 planes for a total of 441 planes.

Bombing of Darwin

The Bombing of Darwin on 19 February 1942 was the largest single attack ever mounted by a foreign power on Australia. On that day, 242 Japanese aircraft, in two separate raids, attacked the town, ships in Darwin's harbour and the town's two airfields in an attempt to prevent the Allies from using them as bases to contest the invasion of Timor and Java. The town was only lightly defended and the Japanese inflicted heavy losses upon the Allied forces at little cost to themselves. The urban areas of Darwin also suffered some damage from the raids and there were a number of civilian casualties.

Indian Ocean Raid

Between 31 March and 10 April 1942 the Japanese conducted a naval sortie against Allied naval forces in the Indian Ocean. The Fast Carrier Task Force (Kidō Butai), consisting of six carriers commanded by Admiral Chūichi Nagumo, inflicted heavy losses on the British fleet, with the sinking of 1 carrier, 2 cruisers, 2 destroyers, and 23 merchant ships for the loss of 20 aircraft. Attacks on the island of Ceylon were also carried out.

Battle of the Coral Sea

The 1st Air Fleet dispatched the Fifth Carrier Division in the Coral Sea during the return from the Indian Ocean. On May 7 the USN sighted the Port Moresby invasion force and mistook it for the main carrier force. Admiral Fletcher sent an aircraft strike which sank the IJN light carrier Shōhō. After this loss of air cover, the Port Moresby invasion force abandoned its mission and retreated north. On the same day the IJN sighted and sank USN destroyer  and oiler . The primary action took place on 8 May. Both carrier forces sighted and attacked each other. USN aircraft managed to damage Shōkaku, meaning that she and her sister ship were unable to participate in the following operation. The remaining fleet returned to Japan to prepare for the Midway invasion (Operation MI).

Battle of Midway

Admiral Isoroku Yamamoto planned to lure and destroy USN carriers by attacking the Midway Islands in June 1942. The Japanese were unaware that the United States had broken their naval code. As a result of this, USN carriers were already in the area when the Japanese attacked Midway. On 3 June US land-based bombers from Midway attacked the Japanese fleet but scored no hits. On 4 June, due to the poor reconnaissance efforts and tactical mistakes of Vice Admiral Chūichi Nagumo, USN dive bombers were able to surprise the Japanese carrier force and destroyed three carriers (Akagi, Kaga and Sōryū). At the time of the attack the Japanese carriers were in the process of preparing to launch an air strike against the US carriers and their hangars were full of loaded aircraft, bombs and aviation fuel which decisively contributed to their destruction. Carrier Hiryū managed to survive the attack and Rear Admiral Tamon Yamaguchi launched a strike against Yorktown. In response, the US launched a strike against Hiryū and sank her. That day the Japanese lost four aircraft carriers and much of their experienced aircrew.

Battle of the Philippine Sea

The US Navy's attack on the Japanese base at Truk (Chuuk) on 17 February 1944 (Operation Hailstone) surprised the Japanese military. In response, the Japanese Navy ordered all of the 61st Air Flotilla to the Mariana Islands. Its Number 261 Kaigun Kōkūtai (fighter) advanced to Saipan circa 19–24 February 1944, but attrition in air combats and illness weakened the unit greatly and it played only a minor role in the Battle of the Philippine Sea. Elements of No. 263 Kaigun Kōkūtai (fighter) of the 61st Air Flotilla were stationed on Guam from 15 June 1944 and participated in the battle.

Battle of Leyte Gulf

After disastrous losses at the Battle of the Philippine Sea, the Japanese carrier force was again practically without aircrew and aircraft. This meant that at the Battle of Leyte Gulf the IJN carrier force was only used as a decoy force where it was ultimately destroyed, the battle that saw the last Kidō Butai survivor, Zuikaku, along with Zuiho, Chiyoda and Chitose succumbing to US air attacks of Admiral William F. Halsey's Task Force 38.

References

Citations

Bibliography
 Hata, Ikuhiko; Izawa, Yasuho and Shores, Christopher, (2011). Japanese Naval Air Force Fighter Units and Their Aces 1932–1945, Grub Street, 
 
 Prange, Gordon W. in collaboration with Goldstein, Donald M. and Dillon, Katherine V. (1981). At Dawn We Slept: The Untold Story of Pearl Harbor, Penguin Books, Ltd., 
 Thorpe, Donald W. (1977). Japanese Naval Air Force Camouflage and Markings World War II. Fallbrook, CA: Aero Publishers, 1977.  (hardcover; paperback ).
 "Monthly the Maru" series, and "The Maru Special" series,  (Japan)
 "Monthly Ships of the World" series,  (Japan)
 "Famous Airplanes of the World" series and "Monthly Kōku Fan" series, Bunrindō (Japan)

External links
 Kidō Butai at Combined Fleet.com
 Air Units of the Imperial Japanese Navy, Globalsecurity.com

Fleets of the Imperial Japanese Navy
Units of the Imperial Japanese Navy Air Service
Military units and formations established in 1941
Military units and formations disestablished in 1942
Military units and formations established in 1943
Military units and formations disestablished in 1945
1945 disestablishments in Japan